K. L. Shivalinge Gowda (30 June 1926 – 6 July 2019) was an Indian politician from the state of Karnataka. He was a member of the Janata Party (JP), and was member of the Legislative Assembly from Sathnanur in 1978 and from Virupakshipura constituency in 1962 as an independent.

References  

Mysore MLAs 1962–1967
Karnataka MLAs 1978–1983
Members of the Mysore Legislature
1926 births
2019 deaths
Janata Party politicians
People from Ramanagara district